Council of the Fallen was an American death metal band formed in Tampa, Florida. Council of the Fallen have released two LPs and one EP album.

History
Council of the Fallen was formed in Tampa, Florida in 1997 under the name "Vehement". 
Steve Asheim of Deicide joined the band in November 2007, prior to bands' break-up.

Council of the Fallen split-up in 2007. Three members of the band Kevin Quirion, Scott Patrick and Steve Asheim, regrouped as Order of Ennead.

Members
Last lineup
Steve Asheim – drums, percussion
Kevin Quirion – vocals, rhythm guitar
Scott Patrick – bass guitar
Santiago Dobles – lead guitar
Previous members
Derek Roddy – lead guitar
Sean Baxter – vocals, bass, guitar, violin
David Kinkade – drums

Discography

Studio albums
Revealing Damnation (2002)
Deciphering the Soul (2004)
Sever All Negatives (EP) (2006)

References

Musical groups established in 1997
Death metal musical groups from Florida
Musical groups from Tampa, Florida
Earache Records artists
Season of Mist artists
Musical groups disestablished in 2007